The Valdes Peninsula (Spanish: Península Valdés) is a peninsula into the Atlantic Ocean in the Biedma Department of north-east Chubut Province, Argentina. Around  in size (not taking into account the isthmus of Carlos Ameghino which connects the peninsula to the mainland), it is an important nature reserve which was listed as a World Heritage Site by UNESCO in 1999.

Geography 
The nearest large town is Puerto Madryn. The only town on the peninsula is the small settlement of Puerto Pirámides.  There are also a number of estancias, where sheep are raised.

Most of the peninsula is barren land with some salt lakes.  The largest of these lakes is at an elevation of about 40 m below sea level (see extremes on Earth), until recently thought to be the lowest elevation in Argentina and South America (the lowest point actually being Laguna del Carbón, Argentina).

Fauna 

The coastline is inhabited by marine mammals, like sea lions, elephant seals and fur seals. The peninsula also contains the most important breeding ground for Southern right whales in the world. They can be found in Golfo Nuevo and Golfo San José, protected bodies of water located between the peninsula and the Patagonian mainland. These baleen whales arrive between May and December, for mating and giving birth, because the water in the gulf is quieter and warmer than in the open sea. Orcas can also be found off the coast, in the open sea off the peninsula. They are known to beach themselves on shore to capture sea lions and elephant seals.

The inner part of the peninsula is inhabited by rheas, guanacos and maras. A high diversity and range of birds live in the peninsula as well; at least 181 bird species, 66 of which migratory, live in the area, including the Antarctic pigeon.

Climate
Valdes Peninsula has a semi-arid climate. It has a climate typical of northern Patagonia that is modified with interactions between atmospheric circulation patterns and the adjacent ocean. The peninsula is located between the subtropical high pressure belt (located at 30oS) and the subpolar low pressure zone (located between 60o–70oS), resulting in the wind being predominantly from the west.

Mean annual precipitation is low, averaging  although this is highly variable from year to year. Precipitation is fairly evenly distributed throughout the year though April–June receives the most precipitation. The El Niño Southern Oscillation strongly influences the climate of the peninsula. During an El Niño year, precipitation is higher from November to February.

References

External links

 
 
  (Orca Conservation group at the Peninsula Valdes)

World Heritage Sites in Argentina
Landforms of Chubut Province
Peninsulas of Argentina
Ramsar sites in Argentina
Tourist attractions in Chubut Province